Haydn Gwynne is an English actress. She was nominated for the 1992 BAFTA TV Award for Best Light Entertainment Performance for the comedy series Drop the Dead Donkey (1990–1991), and won the 2009 Drama Desk Award for Outstanding Featured Actress in a Musical for her role in the Broadway production of Billy Elliot the Musical. She is also a four-time Olivier Award nominee. Her other television roles include Peak Practice (1999–2000), Merseybeat (2001–2002), and playing Camilla in The Windsors (2016–2020).

Personal life
Born in Hurstpierpoint, Sussex to father Guy Thomas Hayden-Gwynne, she played county level tennis before studying sociology at the University of Nottingham, and is fluent in French and Italian. She then took a five-year lectureship in Italy at the University of Rome La Sapienza, where she taught English as a foreign language. Gwynne lives in London with her partner, Jungian psychotherapist Jason Phipps, and their two sons.

She also undertakes voluntary work for the charity Sightsavers International, a group committed to combating blindness in developing countries. In August 2014, Gwynne was one of 200 public figures who were signatories to a letter to The Guardian opposing Scottish independence in the run-up to September's referendum on that issue.

Career
Gwynne became an actress in her mid-twenties. In her first prominent television role she played feminist lecturer Dr Robyn Penrose in the BBC television mini-series dramatisation of David Lodge's Nice Work in 1989.

Her first high-profile comedy role was as Alex Pates in Drop the Dead Donkey in 1990. She then appeared in the 1991 Children's ITV science-fiction series Time Riders and later became a regular in Peak Practice; first appearing at the start of series 7 (episode 1) in 1999 as Dr Joanna Graham. The character of Dr Graham was written out of the show at the end of series 9 (episode 13) when she was fatally shot whilst intervening in a conflict between a man and his daughter. After Peak Practice, Gwynne went on to star in Merseybeat in 2001.

In 2002, she starred in the television drama for the BBC The Secret playing the character of Emma Faraday.

Her theatre work has included regional and London-based appearances, from the Octagon, Bolton in Hedda Gabler, to Richard Cheshire's Way of the World appearing in West End productions of Ziegfeld as Billie Burke (1988), City of Angels and Billy Elliot the Musical at the Victoria Palace Theatre, for which she was nominated for an Olivier Award. She reprised her role as Mrs Wilkinson in the Broadway production of Billy Elliot, which opened at the Imperial Theatre on 13 November 2008. Gwynne has been awarded the Outer Critics Circle Award, Theatre World Award, and Drama Desk Award for her performance in Billy Elliot. She was also nominated for a 2009 Tony Award, Featured Actress in a Musical.

Gwynne has also performed in numerous productions for the Royal Shakespeare Company. Her television appearances are now usually in shorter dramas, such as the role of Julius Caesar's wife, Calpurnia, in the TV series Rome. She also appeared in the first Christmas special episode of Midsomer Murders “Ghosts of Christmas Past” (2004) as Jennifer Carter.

She has guest-starred in an episode of Lewis in the first of a new series (2008). She appeared in the first episode of series 2, "And the Moonbeams Kiss the Sea", playing the character of Sandra Walters. She appeared in the 2011 film Hunky Dory.

Gwynne performed at the Almeida Theatre in Islington in a performance of Becky Shaw which ran from 20 January until 5 March 2011. She also appeared in a second episode of the Midsomer Murders series 14, called "Dark Secrets" as Maggie Viviani which aired in Britain in 2011. Gwynne starred in the Shakespeare play Richard III alongside Kevin Spacey at The Old Vic in London during summer 2011 as part of the Bridge Project.

In October and November 2012, Gwynne toured in the play Duet for One. In 2013, she appeared as Margaret Thatcher in the premiere of the stage play The Audience by Peter Morgan.

In 2014, she featured in an episode of Ripper Street as a woman living her life as a man to escape what she felt were the horrors of being a woman. In 2015 she starred alongside Tamsin Greig in the new musical Women on the Verge of a Nervous Breakdown, based on the Pedro Almodovar film, at The Playhouse in London.

In January 2014, she appeared in the episode "Fraternity" of the BBC forensic science series Silent Witness, followed by appearances in another two BBC series in February: the British sitcom Uncle and the crime comedy-drama Death in Paradise (Series 3, Episode 5). In 2015, she appeared in the BBC Father Brown episode, "The Last Man".

In 2016, she starred as Mrs Peacham in Simon Stephens' adaptation of Bertolt Brecht's and Kurt Weill's Threepenny Opera, alongside Rory Kinnear as Macheath, Nick Holder as Mr Peacham, Rosalie Craig as Polly Peacham and Sharon Small as Jenny Diver at the National Theatre in London. In the same year, she played Camilla, Duchess of Cornwall, in the Channel Four sitcom The Windsors, which is based around the British royal family. In October 2021, Gwynne took over the role of Evangeline Harcourt for the final weeks of the London revival of Anything Goes at the Barbican Theatre. In 2022, she played Susan Hussey in the fifth series of The Crown, also written by Peter Morgan.

Awards and nominations

Television

Theatre

References

External links
 

1957 births
Living people
20th-century English actresses
21st-century English actresses
Actresses from Sussex
Alumni of the University of Nottingham
Drama Desk Award winners
English film actresses
English radio actresses
English stage actresses
English television actresses
People from Hurstpierpoint
Theatre World Award winners